The Anglican Diocese of Lagos Mainland is one of 13 within the Anglican Province of Lagos, itself one of 14 provinces within the Church of Nigeria. The bishop emeritus is Adebayo Dada Akinde and the current bishop is Akinpelu Johnson; Johnson was consecrated a bishop on 24 July 2016 at Archbishop Vinning Memorial Church Cathedral, Ikeja.

References

Church of Nigeria dioceses
Dioceses of the Province of Lagos